The mammal species of Borneo include 288 species of terrestrial and 91 species of marine mammals recorded within the territorial boundaries of Brunei, Indonesia and Malaysia. The terrestrial mammals are dominated by the chiroptera (102 species of bats) and rodents (61 species of rats and mice).

Introduction
The high diversity and endemicity of mammals is related to the many niches found in the tropical rain forest of Borneo and past Pleistocene events within the Sundaland region. During interglacial and post-glacial periods, there was migration of animal from the Asian mainland into Borneo and into Sulawesi via the Philippines. Due to lack of favourable habitats and small founder population, some species of animals have become extinct and others have radiated into endemic species. Of the 57 mammal species that were identified from archaeological remains in the Niah Caves, Sarawak, 13 were bats. Four of these were megachiropterans, Pteropus vampyrus, Rousettus amplexicaudatus, Rousettus sp and Eonycteris spelaea, all of which remain extant species in Borneo and Peninsular Malaysia. 
The provisional list of mammals of Borneo (sensu Lord Medway, Payne et al., Corbet and Hill, Koopman, and Wilson and Reeder) are listed below. There are various conflicts in the taxonomic lists by previous authors, which need further field research for validation.

Taxonomic list
The following list gives the scientific name followed by the common names, description, ecology, conservation and distribution information.

Order: Erinaceomorpha
 Echinosorex gymnura, moonrat. Thailand, Malay Peninsula, Sabah, Sarawak, Brunei and Kalimantan.
 Hylomys suillus, short-tailed gymnure. China, Myanmar, Indochina, Thailand, Malay Peninsula, Sabah and Sarawak.

Order: Soricomorpha
 Suncus murinus, house shrew. Africa, Asia, Thailand, Malay Peninsula, Sabah, Sarawak, Brunei and Kalimantan.
 Suncus ater, black shrew. Endemic to Borneo; known only from Gunung Kinabalu
 Suncus etruscus, Savi's pigmy shrew. Europe, Africa, Asia; Thailand, Malay Peninsula, Sabah and Sarawak.
 Crocidura monticola, Sunda shrew. Java, Lombok, Sumba and Flores; Malay Peninsula, Sabah, Sarawak, Brunei and Kalimantan.
 Crocidura fuliginosa, south-east Asia white-toothed shrew. India, Indochina, Thailand, Malay Peninsula, Sabah, Sarawak, Brunei and Kalimantan.
 Chimarrogale himalayica, Himalayan water shrew. Himalaya, south China, Southeast Asia, Japan, Sumatra and Sabah.

Order: Scandentia
 Ptilocercus lowii, pentail treeshrew.
 Tupaia glis, common treeshrew.
 Tupaia splendidula, ruddy treeshrew.
 Tupaia montana, mountain tree shrew.
 Tupaia minor, lesser treeshrew.
 Tupaia gracilis, slender treeshrew.
 Tupaia picta, painted treeshrew.
 Tupaia dorsalis, striped treeshrew.
 Tupaia tana, large treeshrew.
 Dendrogale melanura, smooth-tailed treeshrew.

Order: Dermoptera
 Galeopterus variegatus, Sunda flying lemur

Order: Chiroptera
 Rousettus amplexicaudatus, Geoffroy's rousette
 Rousettus spinalatus, bare-backed rousette
 Pteropus vampyrus, large flying fox
 Pteropus hypomelanus, island flying fox

 Cynopterus brachyotis, lesser short-nosed fruit bat
 Cynopterus sphinx, greater short-nosed fruit bat
 Cynopterus horsfieldi, Horsfield's fruit bat
 Penthetor lucasi, dusky fruit bat
 Megaerops ecaudatus, tailless fruit bat
 Megaerops wetmorei, white-collared fruit bat
 Dyacopterus spadiceus, Dayak fruit bat
 Chironax melanocephalus, black-capped fruit bat
 Balionycteris maculata, spotted-winged fruit bat
 Aethalops aequalis, grey fruit bat
 Eonycteris spelaea, cave nectar bat
 Eonycteris major, greater nectar bat
 Macroglossus minimus, long-tongued nectar bat
 Emballonura alecto, greater sheath-tailed bat
 Emballonura monticola, lesser sheath-tailed bat
 Saccolaimus saccolaimus, pouched tomb bat
 Taphozous melanopogon, black-bearded tomb bat
 Taphozous longimanus, long-winged tomb bat
 Megaderma spasma, lesser false vampire
 Nycteris tragata, hollow-faced bat
 Rhinolophus borneensis, Bornean horseshoe bat
 Rhinolophus pusillus, least horseshoe
 Rhinolophus arcuatus, arcuatus horseshoe bat

 Rhinolophus acuminatus, acuminate horseshoe bat
 Rhinolophus affinis, intermediate horseshoe bat
 Rhinolophus creaghi, Creagh's horseshoe bat
 Rhinolophus philippinensis, Philippine horseshoe bat
 Rhinolophus trifoliatus, trefoil horseshoe bat
 Rhinolophus sedulus, lesser woolly horseshoe bat
 Hipposideros ater, dusky roundleaf bat
 Hipposideros bicolor, bicolor roundleaf bat
 Hipposideros cineraceus, ashy roundleaf bat
 Hipposideros dyacorum, Dayak roundleaf bat
 Hipposideros doriae, least roundleaf

 Hipposideros ridleyi, Ridley's roundleaf bat
 Hipposideros cervinus, fawn roundleaf bat
 Hipposideros galeritus, Cantor's roundleaf bat
 Hipposideros coxi, Cox's roundleaf bat
 Hipposideros larvatus, intermediate roundleaf bat
 Hipposideros diadema, diadem roundleaf bat
 Coelops robinsoni, lesser tailless roundleaf bat
 Myotis muricola, whiskered myotis
 Myotis ater, black myotis
 Myotis montivagus, large brown myotis
 Myotis siligorensis, small-toothed myotis
 Myotis ridleyi, Ridley's myotis
 Myotis horsfieldii, Horsfield's myotis
 Myotis hasseltii, Hasselt's large-footed myotis
 Myotis adversus, grey large-footed myotis
 Myotis macrotarsus, pallid large-footed myotis
 Pipistrellus javanicus, Javan pistrelle
 Pipistrellus tenuis, least pipistrelle
 Pipistrellus ceylonicus, dark brown pipistrelle
 Hypsugo kitcheneri, red-brown pipistrelle
 Falsistrellus petersi, wooly pipistrelle
 Arielulus cuprosus, coppery pipistrelle
 Hypsugo imbricatus, brown pipistrelle
 Hypsugo macrotis, big-eared pipistrelle
 Pipistrellus vordermanni, white-winged pipistrelle
 Glischropus tylopus, thick-thumb pipistrelle
 Philetor brachypterus, narrow-winged brown bat
 Hesperoptenus doriae, false serotine
 Hesperoptenus blanfordi, least false serotine
 Hesperoptenus tomesi, Tomes' false serotine
 Tylonycteris robustula, greater bamboo bat
 Tylonycteris pachypus, lesser bamboo bat
 Scotophilus kuhlii, yellow house bat
 Murina cyclotis, orange tube-nosed bat
 Murina aenea, bronzed tube-nosed bat
 Murina rozendaali, gilded tube-nosed bat
 Murina suilla, lesser tube-nosed bat
 Harpiocephalus harpia, hairy-winged bat
 Kerivoula papillosa, papillose woolly bat
 Kerivoula hardwickii, Hardwicke's woolly bat
 Kerivoula pellucida, clear-winged woolly bat
 Kerivoula intermedia, small woolly bat
 Kerivoula minuta, least woolly bat
 Kerivoula whiteheadi, Whitehead's woolly bat
 Kerivoula lenis, lenis woolly bat
 Phoniscus jagorii, frosted groove-toothed bat
 Phoniscus atrox, gilded groove-thoothed bat
 Miniopterus magnater, large bent-winged bat
 Miniopterus schreibersi, common bent-winged bat
 Miniopterus pusillus, small bent-winged bat
 Miniopterus medius, medium bent-winged bat
 Miniopterus australis, lesser bent-winged bat
 Cheiromeles torquatus, naked bat
 Mops mops, free-tailed bat
 Chaerephon plicata, wrinkle-lipped bat

Order: Primates

 Nycticebus coucang, Sunda slow loris
 Tarsius bancanus, western tarsier
 Presbytis melalophos, banded langur
 Presbytis hosei, Hose's langur
 Presbytis rubicunda, maroon langur
 Presbytis chrysomelas, Sarawak surili
 Presbytis frontata, white-fronted langur
 Trachypithecus cristatus, silvered langur
 Nasalis larvatus, proboscis monkey
 Macaca fascicularis, long-tailed macaque
 Macaca nemestrina, pig-tailed macaque
 Hylobates muelleri, Müller's Bornean gibbon
 Hylobates albibarbis, Bornean white-bearded gibbon
 Pongo pygmaeus, Bornean orangutan

Order: Pholidota
 Manis javanica, pangolin

Order: Rodentia
 Ratufa affinis, giant squirrel
 Callosciurus prevostii, Prevost's squirrel
 Callosciurus baluensis, Kinabalu squirrel
 Callosciurus notatus, plantain squirrel
 Callosciurus adamsi, ear-spot squirrel
 Callosciurus orestes, Bornean black-banded squirrel
 Sundasciurus hippurus, horse-tailed squirrel
 Sundasciurus lowii, Low's squirrel
 Sundasciurus tenuis, slender squirrel
 Sundasciurus jentinki, Jentink's squirrel
 Sundasciurus brookei, Brooke's squirrel
 Glyphotes simus, red-bellied sculptor squirrel
 Lariscus insignis, three-striped ground squirrel
 Lariscus hosei, four-striped ground squirrel
 Dremomys everetti, Bornean mountain ground squirrel
 Rhinosciurus laticaudatus, shrew-faced ground squirrel
 Nannosciurus melanotis, black-eared pigmy squirrel
 Exilisciurus exilis, plain pigmy squirrel
 Exilisciurus whiteheadi, Whitehead's pigmy squirrel
 Rheithrosciurus macrotis, tufted ground squirrel
 Petaurillus hosei, Hose's pigmy flying squirrel
 Petaurillus emiliae, lesser pigmy flying squirrel
 Iomys horsfieldii, Horsfield's flying squirrel
 Aeromys tephromelas, black flying squirrel
 Aeromys thomasi, Thomas's flying squirrel
 Petinomys hageni, Hagen's flying squirrel
 Petinomys genibarbis, whiskered flying squirrel
 Petinomys setosus, Temminck's flying squirrel
 Petinomys vordermanni, Vordermann's flying squirrel
 Hylopetes lepidus, grey-cheeked flying squirrel
 Hylopetes spadiceus, red-cheeked flying squirrel
 Pteromyscus pulverulentus, smoky flying squirrel
 Petaurista petaurista, red giant flying squirrel
 Petaurista elegans, spotted giant flying squirrel
 Rattus rattus, house rat
 Rattus tiomanicus, Malaysian field rat
 Rattus argentiventer, ricefield rat
 Rattus baluensis, summit rat
 Rattus exulans, Polynesia rat
 Rattus norvegicus, Norway rat
 Sundamys muelleri, Muller's rat
 Sundamys infraluteus, mountain giant rat

 Niviventer cremoriventer, dark-tailed rat
 Niviventer rapit, long-tailed mountain rat
 Maxomys rajah, brown spiny rat

 Maxomys surifer, red spiny rat
 Maxomys alticola, mountain spiny rat
 Maxomys ochraceiventer, chestnut-bellied spiny rat
 Maxomys baeodon, small spiny rat
 Maxomys whiteheadi, Whitehead's rat
 Leopoldamys sabanus, long-tailed giant rat
 Lenothrix canus, grey tree rat
 Mus musculus castaneus, Asian house rat
 Mus caroli, ricefield mouse
 Chiropodomys gliroides, common pencil-tailed tree-mouse
 Chiropodomys major, large pencil-tailed tree-mouse
 Chiropodomys muroides, grey-bellied pencil-tailed tree-mouse
 Haeromys margarettae, ranee mouse
 Trichys fasciculata, long-tailed porcupine
 Hystrix brachyura, common porcupine
 Hystrix crassispinis, thick-spined porcupine

Order: Cetacea
 Balaenoptera musculus, blue whale
 Balaenoptera physalus, fin whale
 Balaenoptera borealis, sei whale
 Balaenoptera edeni, Bryde's whale
 Balaenoptera acutorostrata, minke whale
 Megaptera novaeangliae, humpback whale
 Physeter macrocephalus, sperm whale
 Kogia breviceps, pigmy sperm whale
 Kogia simus, dwarf sperm whale
 Ziphius cavirostris, Cuvier's beak whale
 Mesoplodon sp., beaked whale
 Orcaella brevirostris, Irrawaddy dolphin
 Peponocephala electra, melon-headed whale
 Feresa attenuata, pigmy killer whale
 Pseudorca crassidens, false killer whale
 Orcinus orca, killer whale
 Globicephala macrorhynchus, short-finned pilot whale
 Steno bredanensis, rough-toothed dolphin
 Sousa chinensis, Indo-Pacific hump-backed dolphin
 Lagenodelphis hosei, Fraser's dolphin
 Delphinus delphis, common dolphin
 Tursiops truncatus, bottlenose dolphin
 Grampus griseus, Risso's dolphin
 Stenella attenuata, spotted dolphin
 Stenella coeruleoalba, striped dolphin
 Stenella longirostris, long-snouted spinner dolphin
 Neophocaena phocaenoides, finless porpoise

Order: Carnivora
 Bay cat, Catopuma badia 
 Sunda clouded leopard, Neofelis diardi 
 Marbled cat, Pardofelis marmorata 
 Flat-headed cat, Prionailurus planiceps 
 Sunda leopard cat, Prionailurus javanensis

 Helarctos malayanus, sun bear
 Martes flavigula, yellow-throated marten
 Mustela nudipes, Malay weasel
 Melogale everetti, Bornean ferret-badger 
 Mydaus javanensis, Malay badger
 Lutra sumatrana, hairy-nosed otter
 Lutra lutra, Eurasian otter
 Lutrogale perspicillata, smooth-coated otter
 Aonyx cinereus, oriental small-clawed otter
 Viverra tangalunga, Malay civet
 Prionodon linsang, banded linsang
 Paradoxurus hermaphroditus, common palm civet
 Paguma larvata, masked palm civet
 Arctictis binturong, bearcat
 Arctogalidia trivirgata, small-toothed palm civet
 Hemigalus derbyanus, banded palm civet
 Diplogale hosei, Hose's civet
 Cynogale bennettii, otter-civet
 Herpestes brachyurus, short-tailed mongoose
 Herpestes semitorquatus, collared mongoose

Order: Sirenia
 Dugong dugon, dugong

Order: Proboscidea
 Elephas maximus borneensis, Borneo elephant

Order: Perissodactyla
 Bornean rhinoceros, Dicerorhinus sumatrensis harrissoni. One individual found in eastern Kalimantan in 2016.

Order: Artiodactyla
 Sus barbatus, bearded pig
 Tragulus javanicus, lesser mouse-deer
 Tragulus napu, greater mouse-deer
 Muntiacus atherodes, Bornean yellow muntjac
 Muntiacus muntjak, red muntjac
 Rusa timorensis, Javan rusa
 Rusa unicolor, Sambar deer
Bos javanicus, banteng or tembadau. Present in Kalimantan, Sabah, and possibly Sarawak; believed extinct in Brunei.

Extinct 
 Bornean tiger, possibly

See also 
Biodiversity of Borneo
Fauna of Borneo
Flora of Borneo
Malaysian Wildlife Law
Mammals of Australia

References

External links
 Biogeography of Myotis & Wallace Lines
 Zoology in Universiti Malaysia Sarawak
 Mammal Species of the World
 Integrated Taxonomic Information System
 A Brief Survey of Mammals in Imbak Canyon 
 Morphology of Hipposideros
 Climate Change and Biodiversity
 Tree of Life
 Mammalian Species Accounts
 Taxonomy of Mammal
 Chiroptera
 Plate Tectonics Meets Genomics
 Small mammals of Kelabit
 Mammals of Lambir National Park
 Bats of Kelabit Highlands
 Fruit Bats in Borneo - Size Matters
 H D Rijksen, E Meijaard. Our Vanishing Relative: The Status of Wild Orang-Utans at the Close of the Twentieth Century
 Mammal references
 Rediscovery of Bay Cat by Mohd Azlan
 Biogeography and Palaeoecology
 Research on mammal in Sarawak
 Two new species of tree frogs found in Borneo article is not relevant to mammals

 
Borneo

 Borneo